The St. Paul's Hospital Millennium Medical College in Addis Ababa is the first largest hospital in Ethiopia.

History
The hospital was built by Emperor Haile Selassie I in 1969 with the help of the German Evangelical Church.  It aimed to serve the poor.

A medical college was formed in 2007.

Capacity
The hospital has 350 beds sees an annual average of 300,000. It has a catchment population of more than 5 million.

The hospital has 1200 clinical and non-clinical staff

Departments
There are over 13 departments which include:
 Forensic medicine and toxicology 
 Internal medicine
 Neurology
 General Surgery
 ENT
 Psychiatry
 Ophthalmology
 Dentistry
 Maxillofacial Surgery)
 Radiology
 Dermatology
 Obstetrics and Gynecology
 Pediatrics
 Biomedicine
 Emergency Medicine and Critical Care
 Neurosurgery
 Orthopediacs and Traumatology
 Neurosurgery

Medical School

A medical school, the Millennium Medical College was opened in 2007 to commemorate the new Millennium era of the Ethiopian Calendar (which is 7 years behind the Gregorian Calendar). Students admitted from each region of the country are required to pass written and oral (VIVA) entrance exams.

The school was established by the Ethiopian Ministry of Health with Gordon Williams of the department of urology at the Hammersmith Hospital in London as the first dean. He became the medical director of the Hamlin Fistula Hospital in Addis Ababa.

The enrollment is 40% female.  There are links with University of Addis Ababa, Jimma University, Tulane University and University of Michigan as well as the Open University. The school's provost is Mesfin Araya, a psychiatrist.

References

Hospital buildings completed in 1969
Hospitals in Ethiopia
Buildings and structures in Addis Ababa
1969 establishments in Ethiopia
20th-century architecture in Ethiopia